The Ambassador Extraordinary and Plenipotentiary of the Russian Federation to the Kingdom of Denmark is the official representative of the President and the Government of the Russian Federation to the Prime Minister and the Government of Denmark.

The ambassador and his staff work at large in the Embassy of Russia in Copenhagen.

History of diplomatic relations

Diplomatic exchanges between Russia and Denmark date back to the fifteenth century, with the signing of a mutual assistance pact in 1493 between the Grand Duchy of Moscow and the Kingdom of Denmark. In 1700 a permanent diplomatic mission of the Tsardom of Russia was established in Denmark in 1700, and in 1893, during the period of the Russian Empire, representation was upgraded to the level of embassies. 

Despite the disruption to international relations caused by the Russian Revolution in 1917, diplomatic contacts were quickly established between the nascent Russian Soviet Federative Socialist Republic, with the appointment of Vatslav Vorovsky as diplomatic representative to the Scandinavian countries of Denmark, Sweden and Norway. It was during Geyn's tenure that on 18 June 1924 the Soviet mission was officially established in Denmark, with Geyn serving as the officially accredited representative. Representation continued at the level of missions throughout the German invasion and occupation of Denmark in 1940, until the Axis invasion of the Soviet Union in June 1941. In April 1944 the Soviet Union established contacts and assigned a representative to the clandestine Danish Freedom Council. 

Relations were upgraded to the level of embassies in August 1955, and following the dissolution of the Soviet Union in 1991, ambassadors have continued to be exchanged between the Kingdom of Denmark and the Russian Federation.

List of representatives (1658 – present)

Representatives of the Tsardom of Russia to the Kingdom of Denmark (1700 – 1720)

Representatives of the Russian Empire to the Kingdom of Denmark (1721 – 1917)

Representatives of the Russian Provisional Government to the Kingdom of Denmark (1917)

Representatives of the Russian Soviet Federative Socialist Republic to the Kingdom of Denmark (1917 – 1919)

Representatives of the Soviet Union to the Kingdom of Denmark (1923 – 1991)

Representatives of the Russian Federation to the Kingdom of Denmark (1991 – present)

References 

Denmark
Russia